Spotted unicornfish is a common name for:
 Naso brevirostris
 Naso maculatus